Stainfield is a hamlet in the South Kesteven district of Lincolnshire, England. The hamlet is in the civil parish of Haconby.

The name Stainfield (previously Stenfield) derives from "a stony clearing", from the Old Scandinavian 'steinn' and 'thveit'.

Stainfield is the site of a Roman station, a settlement established on account of local mineral springs, where Roman coins have been found.  The King Street (Roman road) passes through the hamlet. The springs were used until the middle of the 18th century. There was once a chapel in the hamlet.

Stainfield is listed in the 1086 Domesday account as "Stainfelde" or "Steinfelde", in the manor of Haconby and Stainfield, and in the Aveland Hundred of Kesteven. The village contained 14 households, 13 villagers, 6 smallholders, 3 freemen and one priest. The Lord in 1066 was Leofric. In 1086 the land was passed to Heppo the bowman, as Lord of the Manor and Tenant-in-chief.

In 1933 Stainfield occupations included two farmers, one at the Manor farm, and three smallholders.

References

External links

"Stainfield", Homepages.which.net. Retrieved 12 June 2013
 Includes Stainfield
 Includes Stainfield

Hamlets in Lincolnshire
South Kesteven District